Luca Costa is an Italian slalom canoeist who has competed since the early 2000s.

He won a silver medal in the K-1 team event at the 2002 ICF Canoe Slalom World Championships in Bourg St.-Maurice and again at the 2008 European Championships in Kraków.

References

Italian male canoeists
Living people
Year of birth missing (living people)
Medalists at the ICF Canoe Slalom World Championships
21st-century Italian people